This is the full discography of Soviet and Russian singer Alla Pugacheva, which consists of:

 34 official singles and 5 additional 
 20 studio albums 
 9 foreign albums
 2 live albums and 9 compilations official

Studio albums

1976 — Поет Десдечадо (Sings Desdechado) (SP, Мелодия, USSR)

1977 — Зеркало души (Mirror of the Soul) (LP, Мелодия, USSR)

1978 — Огледало на душата (LP, Балкантон, Bulgaria) (Bulgarian edition of "Mirror of the Soul")

1979 — Арлекино и другие (Harlequin and other) (LP, Мелодия, USSR)

1980 — Zrkadlo duše (LP, Opus, Czechoslovakia) (Czechoslovak edition of "Mirror of the Soul")

1980 — Поднимись над суетой (Rise above the bustle) (LP, Мелодия, USSR)

1980 — То ли ещё будет… (Whether more will be...) (LP, Мелодия, USSR)

1980 — Huipulla (LP, Finland) 
Finnish Album (Songs in Finnish)
 Kuninkaat voivat mitä vain — Finnish version "Всё могут короли" (Kings Can Do Everything) 
 Näkemiin kesä — Finnish version "До свидания, лето" (Goodbye, summer)
 Oikein hyvä — Finnish version "Очень хорошо" (Very good)
 Minne lapsuus katoaa — Finnish version "Куда уходит детство" (Where does childhood)
 Jos kauan kiusaa itseään — Finnish version "Если долго мучиться" (If long to suffer)
 Näen sinusta unta — Finnish version "Ты снишься мне" (You dream of me) 
 Rakkaus ei luovu — Finnish version "Не отрекаются, любя!" (Do not deny him by loving!)
 Harlekini — Finnish version "Арлекино" (Harlequin)
 Kirkkaat loistavat silmät — Finnish version "Ясные светлые глаза" (Clear bright eyes)
 22+28 — Finnish version
 Saavu — Finnish version "Приезжай" (Come over)
 Ekaluokkalaisen laulu — Finnish version "Песенка первоклассника" (Song first grader)
 Laulu minusta — Finnish version "Песенка про меня (Так же, как все) (A song about me to)
 Laulava nainen — Finnish version "Женщина, которая поёт!" (The woman who sings)

1981 — Alla Pugačova (LP, Supraphon, Czechoslovakia) (Czechoslovak edition of "Whether more will be...") 

1981 — Дежурный ангел (The attendant Angel)(SP, Мелодия, USSR)
1981 — Маэстро (Maestro) (SP, Мелодия, USSR)
1981 — Tähtikesä (LP, Finland)
1982 — Как тревожен этот путь (How anxious a path like this) (2 LP, Мелодия, USSR)
1982 — Парад планет Марка Минкова (Parade of planets Mark Minkov) (LP, Мелодия, USSR)
1982 — У Вас в гостях Маэстро (You Away Maestro) (LP, Мелодия, USSR)
1983 — Миллион алых роз (Million scarlet roses) (LP, Victor, Japan)
1983 — Ах, как хочется жить (Ah, how I want to live) (LP, Мелодия, USSR)
1983 — Alla Pugačovová. Dávná piseň (LP, Czechoslovakia)
1984 — Soviet Superstar (Greatest Hits 1976-84) (2 LP, Track, Sweden)
1984 — Цыганский хор (Gipsy choir) (SP, Мелодия, USSR)
1984 — Алла Пугачёва поёт песни Ильи Резника (Alla Pugacheva sings songs Ilya Reznik) (SP, Мелодия, USSR)
1985 — Watch out (LP, World Record Music, Sweden)
1985 — Алла Пугачёва в Стокгольме (Alla Pugacheva in Stockholm) (LP, Мелодия, USSR)
1986 — …Счастья в личной жизни! (Песни Игоря Николаева) (Happiness in your personal life - songs Igor Nikolayev) (LP, Мелодия, USSR)
1986 — Паромщик (SP, Мелодия, USSR)
1986 — Две звезды (Two Star) (SP, Мелодия, USSR)
1987 — Алла Пугачёва-87 (Alla Pugacheva-97)(LP, Мелодия, USSR)
1987 — Окраина (Outskirts) (SP, Мелодия, USSR)
1987 — Пришла и говорю (Has come and speak) (LP, Мелодия, USSR)
1988 — Песни вместо писем (с Удо Линденбергом) (Songs instead of letters (with Udo Lindenberg)) (LP, Мелодия, USSR)
1988 — Миллион алых роз (Million scarlett roses)(CD, Victor, Japan)
1989 — Paromshik (LP, Finland)
1990 — Алла (Alla) (CD, Мелодия, USSS)
1990 — Мой голубь (My dove) (SP, Мелодия, USSR)
1991 — Алла Пугачева (Alla Pugacheva) (LP, Ритонис, Latvia)
1991 — Рождественские встречи 1990 (Christmas meetings 1990)(LP, Русский диск, USSR)
1992 — Рождественские встречи 1991 (Christmas meetings 1991) (LP, Русский диск, Russia)
1993 — Без меня (Without Me)
1994 — Верю в тебя (I believe in you) (CD, Мелодия, Russia)
1994 — Любовь, похожая на сон (Песни Игоря Крутого) (Love Is Like a Dream (Song of Igor Krutogo)) (2 CD, Jeff Music Corp., Russia)
1994 — Путь звезды (Star Way)
1995 — Не делайте мне больно, господа (Do not hurt me, gentlemen)
1997 — Две звезды (Two Stars)
1997 — Примадонна (Primadonna)
1998 — Да! (Yes!)
1999 — Белый снег (Snow white)
2000 — Alla Pugaczowa (СD, Польша) (Roland edition - "Do not hurt me, gentlemen")
2000 — Мадам Брошкина (Madam Broshkina)
2001 — Алла в Рождественских встречах XX века (Alla Christmas Meetings in the 20th Century) (CD 3) 
2002 — Речной трамвайчик (Water bus)
2002 — А был ли мальчик? (А. Пугачёва / Любаша) (Was there a boy? (A.Pugacheva / Ljubasha))
2002 — Это любовь! (It's Love)
2003 — Живи спокойно, страна! (Live quietly, the country!)
2007 — Новые и неизданные песни / 2002—2006 (New and unreleased songs / 2002-2006 )
2008 — Приглашение на закат (Invitation to sunset) (CD, Russia)
2009 — Сады вишнёвые (Cherry Gardens) (CD, Russia)
2013 — Алла Пугачёва поет песни Юрия Чернавского (Alla Pugacheva sings songs Yuri Chernavskii) (LP, Russia)

References

External links 
 Alla Pugacheva biography
 Alla Rugacheva. Biografy

Discographies of Russian artists
Discography